Bode is an American clothing company that makes clothing from old textiles and newly-made traditional textiles.

The company opened its first retail store in 2019.

References

External links
 

Clothing brands of the United States
2019 in fashion